Ernest Wood (1883–1965) was an English yogi, theosophist, Sanskrit scholar, and author.

Ernest Wood may also refer to:
 Ernest M. Wood (1863–1956), architect based in Quincy, Illinois
 Ernest Wood (actor) (died 1942), American stage and screen actor
 Ernest E. Wood (1875–1952), U.S. Representative from Missouri
 Ernest Wood (Manitoba politician) (1862–?), English-born farmer and political figure in Manitoba